Zachód (lit. West) is one of four districts (Polish: dzielnica) of Szczecin, Poland situated on the left bank of Oder river in western part of the city. As of January 2011 it had a population of 116,232.

Zachód is divided into 9 municipal neighbourhoods: 
 Arkońskie-Niemierzyn
 Głębokie-Pilchowo
 Gumieńce
 Krzekowo-Bezrzecze
 Osów
 Pogodno
 Pomorzany
 Świerczewo
 Zawadzkiego-Klonowica

References

Neighbourhoods of Szczecin